Sigurður Gylfi Magnússon (born August 29, 1957) is an Icelandic historian specialising in microhistory. He was an independent scholar from the time he finished his doctoral dissertation 1993 until 2010. He established the Center for Microhistorical Research at the Reykjavík Academy) in 2003. He got a research position at the National Museum of Iceland named after Dr. Kristján Eldjárn, the former president of Iceland and an archaeologist, in 2010 and until 2013. After that he became a Professor of Cultural History at the Department of History at the University of Iceland.

The following text is mostly based on his book The History War: Essays and Narrative on Ideology (Reykjavik, The Center for Microhistorical Research, 2007) (http://sgm.hi.is), which is autobiographical in nature and deals with historiographical issues such as the development of ideas which are part of the microhistorical agenda. Magnússon is the author of 26 books (http://sgm.hi.is) and has been involved in the publication of fifty more through two book series which he has co-edited with few of his fellow historians; the first one is called Anthology of Icelandic Popular Culture, or in Icelandic, Sýnibók íslenskrar alþýðumenningar, and the second one is called Microhistories published by Routledge. His co-editor is Dr. István M. Szijártó, a Hungarian microhistorian and a long-time friend.

His latest books in English are: Archive, Slow Ideology and Egodocuments as Microhistorical Autobiography: Potential History (London: Routledge 2021); Emotional Experience and Microhistory. A Life Story of a Destitute Pauper Poet in the 19th Century (London: Routledge, 2020); Minor Knowledge and Microhistory. Manuscript Culture in the Nineteenth Century. Co-author Dr. Davíð Ólafsson (London: Routledge 2017); What is Microhistory? Theory and Practice (London: Routledge, 2013). Co-author Dr. István M. Szijártó; Wasteland with Words. A social history of Iceland was published in 2010 by Reaktion Books in England.

He is married to Dr. Tinna Laufey Ásgeirsdóttir, a Professor of Economics at the University of Iceland and they have one son, Petur Bjarni, who is Sigurður Gylfi stepson.

Biography
Sigurður Gylfi Magnússon was born in the West End of Reykjavik. He completed his B.A. in history and philosophy in 1984 from University of Iceland. His thesis was published a year later in a book called, The Mode of Living in Iceland, 1930–1940, by the Institute of History at the University of Iceland (http://sgm.hi.is). That same year he started his doctoral studies in Pittsburgh, USA, at Carnegie Mellon University in history where he received a M.A. degree in 1988 and a doctoral degree (Ph.D.) in 1993. His dissertation dealt with popular culture and is titled The Continuity of Everyday Life: Popular Culture in Iceland 1850–1940 Magnússon taught part-time at the University of Iceland and in other academic settings in Iceland from 1994 when he returned from the USA. He taught at his former university, Carnegie Mellon, in the spring of 2002 when he was a Fulbright Scholar for six months. In 1998 he became the first chair of an independent research institute called The Reykjavik Academy, which was founded by independent scholars who received their education in Iceland, Scandinavia, Europe and USA. The colorful saga of the Reykjavík Academy attracted considerable outside attention, from its humble beginnings as a forum for ten independent scholars to its eventually housing 80 researchers from all areas of the humanities and social sciences.

When Magnússon left the Reykjavík Academy in 2010 around 600 hundred scholars had been part of that community for longer or shorter time. In 2003, Magnússon founded and chaired the Center for Microhistorical Research, which, among other things, runs the international web-page microhistory.org and publishes books on microhistorical issues. He is the editor of the web-journal The Journal of Microhistory with his co-worker and a long-time friend Dr. Davið Ólafsson. Magnússon is the founder and one of three editors of the book series Anthology of Icelandic Popular Culturue which has already published 30 books in cooperation with the University of Iceland Press. The other editors are Dr. Davíð Ólafsson, Assistant Professor in Cultural Studies at the University of Iceland; Dr. Sólveig Ólafsdóttir a postdoctoral scholar and Dr. Bragi Þorgrímur Ólafsson the Head of the Manuscript Department at the National and University Library.

It could be argued that the primary objective of many of Magnússon's work has been to present a view of the ways in which history, and in particular social and cultural history, has developed in the last 15–20 years, at a time of major reassessment within the academic world manifested in the radical ideas grouped under the banner of postmodernism and/or poststructuralism. The History War is based on his former research, which he has published in recent years on first hand sources, microhistory and everyday life. That includes the following books: Dreams of Things Past: Life Writing in Iceland (2004) (http://sgm.hi.is); Metastories: Memory, Recollection, and History (2005) (http://sgm.hi.is); Academic Liturgy. Humanities and the Society of Scholars (2007) (http://sgm.hi.is), and finally a book, which he co-edited, called From Re-evaluation to Disintegration. Two Final Theses, One Introduction, Three Interviews, Seven Articles, Five Photographs, One Afterword and A Few Obituaries from the Field of Humanities (2006) (http://sgm.hi.is).

After mostly dealing with the methods of microhistory for over ten years Magnússon turned back to his empirical research in 2007 with the focus on material culture and everyday life, like in his book Wasteland with Words. A Social History of Iceland (2010), was published by Reaktion books in England (see criticism in The Economist: http://economist.com/culture/displaystory.cfm?story_id=16213940&fsrc=rss). The book is written as an attempt to explain how the culture of Iceland was formed through a long process of literary practice from the beginning of the settlement in the ninth century up to modern times. It is also an analysis of an island culture, which successfully stepped into the twentieth century without losing its cultural identity. That success story ends with the meltdown of the banking, economic, and the political system in 2008. The focus of the book is on the people of Iceland, how they managed to survive in a relatively hostile environment thorough the centuries and become, for a while, one of the wealthiest countries in the world. The resent sequence of events in 2008 are explained in the light of the historical development in Iceland. This is an experiment in social- and/or microhistorical studies, in which he strives to deal with a long period of time using the methods of microhistory.

Sigurður Gylfi Magnússon has done number of research with his friend and fellow historian, Davíð Ólafsson, on how manuscript exchange – the scribal community – as a sociocultural network questions the traditional view of the development of literacy, education and communication in the world. Scribal transmission of texts after the advent of movable-type print technology in Europe has come increasingly under the scrutiny of literary critics, cultural historians, and social bibliographers over the last quarter of a century. The advent of critical and coherent scholarship on the nature and meaning of post-medieval manuscript communications has followed the rise of other fields of socio-cultural history in the post-WWII era, such as the history of literacy, the history of readership, social bibliography, and the history of the book (l'histoire du livre). The role of the scribal medium in creating, transmitting, and preserving literary culture has been re-evaluated in an endeavor that has, in some cases, transformed the established view of cultural and intellectual history. Diverse trends and turns in the historiography of texts add to a strong case for a radical revision of how these practices can be viewed. 
Revisionist approaches have included an emergent emphasis on agency as the capacity of individuals to act within the social structure that seem to limit or influence the opportunities that individuals have. These restraints come in the form of categories like class, gender, and ethnicity on the one hand, and societal institutions on the other, such as the state, the church and the educational system. Somewhere between the two poles of social structures and individual agency, they propose a view exploring the "in-between spaces" where interaction and communication took place. There they argue that one may find "the third dimension" in the shape of informal, rhizomic networks between individuals and texts that connect in a non-linear and non-authorial manner, and can and will connect in every direction without having any center, core or stem. Their focus has been on what they call "barefoot historians", lay scholars who sat and copied or created material that was handled from farm to farm in the modern period in Iceland (see their book: Minor Knowledge and Microhistory. Manuscript Culture in the Nineteenth Century (London: Routledge 2017)). They have dubbed this kind of group of lay scholars and popular poets, that can be found around Iceland throughout the long nineteenth century, "barefoot historians" – and it seems fair to see them, and in fact their scribal culture as a whole, as an informal institution, at least on a par with the official institutions.

After Magnússon became a professor at the University of Iceland he has been successful in terms of funding large research projects like the one that is called My Favourite Things: Material Culture Archives, Cultural Heritage and Meaning which got a Grant of Excellence from the Icelandic Research Forum. He is the PI of the project. It is a collaboration between researchers from the fields of History and Material Culture Studies (Anthropology and Archaeology), together with Museum and Archival Studies. The focus of the research is twofold: Firstly, emphasis is put on exploring the phenomenon of "archive"; how an image of the past is preserved, how people and their material environment are documented in historical sources. Second, focus will be on how the "archive" as a phenomenon and analytical concept has been employed in research within humanities and social sciences. Here we will emphasize how material culture has been archived; what things did people own according to different archives, and how were they used? How did people relate to things, what was their ideological value and everyday significance? Different archives of material culture will be counter posed, thus revealing opportunities to scrutinize the various ideas about the past from a new perspective, and simultaneously providing a new foundation for reviewing academics and scholarship. A fundamental notion behind this approach is the view that material culture and an insight into the materiality of the everyday enables a different and more nuanced perspective on how people structured their lives and identities, and how their material surroundings contributed to that structuring.

This project is situated on an intersection between Material Culture Studies, History, and Museum and Archival Studies. Its main scholarly aim is twofold; a) to investigate the material world of the Icelandic population in the late Modern Era as this is represented in archives of written and material form, and the different relations and interactions between people and things implied in these archives with both macro- and micro-methods; b) to explore the tensions between these different archives, asking how they reflect the material past, and how the possible discrepancies between them may be dealt with. The approach is multidisciplinary and the archives employed are indicative of this.

Sigurður Gylfi has made a number of video performance in recent years both on the importance of microhistory for international scholarship as well of some of his recent publications See also a detailed podcast about his scholarship taken by Petr Jandacek, a microhistorian from the Czech Republic, in November 2021 called #deeptalk.

Recent articles in English
	"Microhistory". Routledge Handbook of Research Methods in the Study of Religion. Second Edition. Micheal Stausberg and Steven Engler eds. (London: Routledge, 2021).
	"In the Name of Barefoot Historians: In-Between Spaces within the Icelandic Educational System." Co-author Davíð Ólafsson. Education Beyond Europe – Models and Traditions before Modernities. Cristiano Casalini, Edward Choi, and Ayenachew Woldegiyorgis eds.  (Leiden: Brill, 2021).
	"The Backside of the Biography: Microhistory as a Research Tool." Fear of Theory. Biography Studies. Hans Renders and David Veltman eds. (Leiden: Brill, 2021).
	"The Devil is in the Detail: What is a 'Great Historical Question'?" Fear of Theory. Biography Studies. Hans Renders and David Veltman eds. (Leiden: Brill, 2021).
	"At the Mercy of Emotions. Archives, Egodocuments and Microhistory". The Routledge Modern History of Emotions. Katie Barcley and Peter N. Stearns eds. (London: Routledge, 2022).
	"One Story, One Person: The Importance of Microhistorical Research for Disability Studies." Understanding Disability Throughout History: Interdisciplinary perspectives in Iceland from Settlement to 1936. Edited by James Rice and Hanna Björg Sigurjónsdóttir (London: Routledge, 2021).
	"The Icelandic Biography and Egodocuments in Historical Writing." Different Lives. Global Perspectives on Biography in Public Cultures and Societies. Biography Studies. Hans Renders and David Veltman eds., in collaboration with Madelon Nanninga-Franssen (Leiden: Brill, 2020), pp. 165–181.
	"What Takes Place, When Nothing Happens? The importance of late modern manuscript culture." Scripta Islandica 69 (2018), pp. 149–175.
	"A 'New Wave' of Microhistory? Or: It's the sama old story – a fight of love and glory." Quaderni storici 155 / a.LII, n. 2, agosto 2017.
	"The Life is Never Over: Biography as a microhistorical approach." The Biographical Turn. Lives in History. Hans Renders, Binne de Haan and Jonne Harmsma eds. (London: Routledge, 2017), pp. 42–52.
	"Far-rearching Microhistory: The Use of Microhistorical Perspective in a Globalized World." Rethinking History 21:3 (2017), pp. 312–341.
	"The Love Game as Expressed in Ego-Documents: The Culture of Emotions in Late Nineteenth Century Iceland." Journal of Social History 50: 1 (2016), pp. 102–119.
	"Views into the Fragments: An Approach from a Microhistorical Perspective." International Journal of Historical Archaeology 20 (2016), pp. 182–206.
	"Microhistory, Biography and Ego-Documents in Historical Writing." Revue d'histoire Nordique 20 (2016), pp. 133–153.
	"Tales of the Unexpected: The 'Textual Environment', Ego-Documents and a Nineteenth-Century Icelandic Love Story – An Approach in Microhistory." Cultural and Social History 12:1 (2015), pp. 77-94.
	"Singularizing the Past: The History and Archaeology of the Small and Ordinary." Co-author Kristján Mímisson. Journal of Social Archaeology 14:2 (2014), pp. 131–156.
	"Gender: A Useful Category in Analysis of Ego-Documents? Memory, historical sources and microhistory." Scandinavian Journal of History 38:2 (2013), pp. 202–222.
	"Living by the Book: Form, Text, and Life Experience in Iceland." In White Field, Black Seeds: Nordic Literacy Practices in the Long Nineteenth-Century. Matthew James Driscoll and Anna Kuismin eds. (Helsinki, 2013), pp. 53–62.
	"Minor Knowledge: Microhistory and the Importance of Institutional Structures." Co-author Davíð Ólafsson. Quaderni Storici 140 / a.XLVII, n.2, agosto 2012, pp. 495–524.
	"The Life of a Working-Class Woman: Selective Modernization and Microhistory in Early 20th-Century Iceland." Scandinavian Journal of History 36:2 (2011), pp. 186–205.
	"Barefoot Historians: Education in Iceland in the Modern Period." Co-author Davíð Ólafsson. Writing Peasants. Studies on Peasant Literacy in Early Modern Northern Europe. Klaus-Joachim Lorenzen-Schmidt and Bjørn Poulsen (eds.). Landbohistorisk Selskab (Århus 2002), pp. 175–209.
	Iceland: a 20th-Century Case of Selective Modernization. Europe Since 1914 – Encyclopedia of the Age of War and Reconstruction. Scribner Library of Modern Europe. Editors in Chief Jay Winter and John Merriman (New York, 2006).
	Iceland: Through the Slow Process of Social and Cultural Change. Encyclopedia of the Modern World. Editor in Chief Peter N. Stearns (New York: Oxford University Press, 2008).
	"The Singularization of History: Social History and Microhistory within the Postmodern State of Knowledge." Journal of Social History, 36 (Spring 2003), pp. 701–735.
	"Social History as "Sites of Memory?" The Institutionalization of History: Microhistory and the Grand Narrative." Journal of Social History Special issue 39:3 (Spring 2006), pp. 891–913.

References

 Sigurður Gylfi Magnússon, https://www.hi.is/starfsfolk/sgm
 Sigurður Gylfi Magnússon, http://www.sgm.hi.is
 Sýnisbók íslenskrar alþýðumenningar, http://www.sia.hi.is
 https://essaydocs.org/sigurur-gylfi-magnsson.html
 https://english.hi.is/faculty_of_economics/conciv
 https://www.youtube.com/watch?v=OBSvBWJcWxI&t=226s)
 https://www.youtube.com/watch?v=bWp1-g0iGzs&t=33s).
 https://steppinintoasia.podbean.com/e/deeptalk-03-sigurdur-gylfi-magnusson/
 Sigurður Gylfi Magnússon, Wasteland with words, http://www.reaktionbooks.co.uk/book.html?id=412
 Sigurður Gylfi Magnússon, "The Singularization of History : Social History and Microhistory within the Postmodern State of Knowledge."
Sigurður Gylfi Magnússon (Co-author Kristján Mímisson), "Singularizing the past: The history and archaeology of the small and ordinary."
Sigurður Gylfi Magnússon (Co-author Dr. István M. Szijártó.)  What is Microhistory? Theory and Practice (London: Routledge, 2013). 
Sigurður Gylfi Magnússon,(Co-author Davíð Ólafsson) "Minor knowledge. Microhistory, scribal communities and the importance of institutional structures", 
Sigurður Gylfi Magnússon, "Far-reaching microhistory: the use of microhistorical perspective in a globalized world."
Sigurður Gylfi Magnússon, "Views into the Fragments: An Approach from a Microhistorical Perspective."
Sigurður Gylfi Magnússon, "Tales of the Unexpected: The 'Textual Environment', Ego-Documents and a Nineteenth-Century Icelandic Love Story – An Approach in Microhistory." 

1957 births
Living people
Sigurdur Gylfi Magnusson
Microhistorians
Independent scholars
Sigurdur Gylfi Magnusson
Sigurdur Gylfi Magnusson
Carnegie Mellon University alumni
Carnegie Mellon University faculty